Odontocycladidae is a family of gastropods belonging to the order Stylommatophora.

Genera:
 Odontocyclas Schlüter, 1838
 Walklea Gittenberger, 1978

References

Stylommatophora